District 64 is an elementary school district serving students in Park Ridge, IL* and part of Niles, IL. The District employs more than 600 staff members who provide a rich academic program and positive learning environment for approximately 4,500 students. The District operates five elementary schools for grades K-5: Carpenter, Field, Franklin, Roosevelt and Washington; two middle schools for grades 6-8: Emerson and Lincoln; and an early childhood education center at Jefferson School.   (*East Maine School District 63 serves a small portion of northeast Park Ridge.)

The district headquarters is located at the Jefferson Early Childhood Center at  8200 Greendale Ave in Niles.

Schools
Middle schools
 Emerson Middle School (in Niles) — Named after Ralph Waldo Emerson, this is a three-story school building.  At one time the district rented the facility to the Chicago Futabakai Japanese School, which used it as its campus.  The middle school replaced an older building, Emerson Junior High School. Emerson is the largest school in the district, population and size.
 Lincoln Middle School (in Park Ridge)
Elementary schools
 Carpenter Elementary School (in Park Ridge)
 Field Elementary School (in Park Ridge)
 Franklin Elementary School (in Park Ridge)
 Roosevelt Elementary School (in Park Ridge)
 Washington Elementary School (Park Ridge)
Early childhood
 Jefferson School (in Niles)

District Leadership 
District 64 is governed by a board of education composed of seven members, President Dr. Denise Pearl, Vice President Carol Sales, Secretary Phyllis Lubinski, Gareth Kennedy, Rebecca Little, Tom Sotos, and Dr. Nicole Woitowich. The board's powers and duties include adopting, enforcing and monitoring district policies, managing the district's budget, and evaluating the performance of the superintendent. 

The district's current superintendent is Dr. Eric Olson who assumed powers on July 1, 2019.

History
The Goodspeed History of Cook County implies that the early history of schools of Park Ridge is unclear, but stated: "By 1860, several schools had been started in that vicinity.  Among the first teachers were R.W. Gunnison, Miss Augusta Meacham, and George A. Follansbee."

With school district renumbering from township-wide to county-wide in 1901, Park Ridge's School District 2 became School District 64.  In 1902 the district had a population of 2,112 people  In the 1901–1902 school year, one principal oversaw 11 other teachers, but for the Autumn 1902 semester, a superintendent oversaw 8 teachers.  At the time there were 5 operating schools in all of Maine Township.

The Maine Township High School District was organized in September 1902 and held school at Park Ridge until the high school building was completed.

Construction on Field, Lincoln, and Theodore Roosevelt schools began in 1929.

By 1958 schools in District 64 included Edison, Emerson Junior High, Field, Franklin, Jefferson, Lincoln Junior High, Madison, Merrill, and Washington.

Notable alumni

 Hillary Clinton — She attended Field School from 1952 to 1959 (kindergarten to grade 6) and Emerson Junior High School from 1959 to 1961 (grades 7 and 8).  In 1997, when Clinton was the First Lady, she visited this school at a reunion with her friends and teachers.

References

External links
 

School districts in Cook County, Illinois
Niles, Illinois
Park Ridge, Illinois